Szymon Pośnik (born 15 June 1993) is a Polish rower.

He won a medal at the 2019 World Rowing Championships.

References

External links

1993 births
Living people
Polish male rowers
World Rowing Championships medalists for Poland
European Rowing Championships medalists
Olympic rowers of Poland
Rowers at the 2020 Summer Olympics